The Guibé's Mantella (Mantella nigricans) is a species of frog in the family Mantellidae.
It is endemic to Madagascar.
Its natural habitats are subtropical or tropical moist lowland forests and rivers.
It is threatened by habitat loss.

References

Mantella
Endemic frogs of Madagascar
Least concern biota of Africa
Amphibians described in 1978
Taxa named by Jean Marius René Guibé
Taxonomy articles created by Polbot